Kentucky Route 195 (KY 195) is a  state highway in the U.S. state of Kentucky. The highway connects Ashcamp with Marrowbone with mostly rural areas of Pike County.

Route description
KY 195 begins at an intersection with KY 197 in Ashcamp, within Pike County. It travels in a fairly northwestern direction. It curves to the north-northwest, at a point just north of Hellier, and begins paralleling Marrowbone Creek. It travels through Big Branch. It then crosses over Marrowbone Creek and passes Maritha Johnson Cemetery just before curving to the northeast. Just before entering Lookout, it has a second crossing of Marrowbone Creek. In Lookout, it intersects the eastern terminus of KY 611 (Poor Bottom Road). KY 195 travels through Rockhouse and curves to the east. It curves to the north-northeast and passes what will eventually become the eastern terminus of KY 3174. It has a third crossing of Marrowbone Creek just south of Wolfpit. Just before leaving Wolfpit, it crosses Wolfpit Branch. The highway immediately curves to the northeast. It crosses over some railroad tracks and crosses over Russell Fork on the Earl Johnson Memorial Bridge just before meets its northern terminus, an intersection with US 460/KY 80 (Regina Belcher Highway).

Major intersections

See also

References

0195
Transportation in Pike County, Kentucky